Nate Shultz (born January 16, 1996) is an American soccer player who currently plays for Greenville Triumph in the USL League One.

Career

College and Amateur
Schultz spent his entire college career at the University of Akron between 2014 and 2017, where he was named USC Second Team All-Great Lakes Region and Second Team All-Mid American Conference in 2017, and Academic All-Mid American Conference in both 2015 and 2016.

He also played for National Premier Soccer League side AFC Cleveland in 2015 and Premier Development League side Portland Timbers U23s in 2017.

Professional
On January 21, 2018, Shultz was selected in the third round (48th overall) of the 2018 MLS SuperDraft by LA Galaxy. He signed with United Soccer League side LA Galaxy II on March 8, 2018.

Following a trial, Shultz was signed by USL League One club Greenville Triumph on March 31, 2022.

References

External links

1996 births
Living people
Akron Zips men's soccer players
American soccer players
Association football defenders
Greenville Triumph SC players
LA Galaxy draft picks
LA Galaxy II players
Portland Timbers U23s players
Soccer players from Ohio
Sportspeople from Cuyahoga County, Ohio
USL Championship players
USL League One players
USL League Two players